Peter Vardy may refer to:

 Peter Vardy (theologian) (born 1945), British academic, philosopher, theologian and author
 Sir  Peter Vardy (businessman) (born 1947), British businessman in the retail automotive industry
 Peter Vardy (footballer) (born 1976), former Australian rules footballer